Rhodium(III) oxide (or Rhodium sesquioxide) is the inorganic compound with the formula Rh2O3.  It is a gray solid that is insoluble in ordinary solvents.

Structure
Rh2O3 has been found in two major forms. The hexagonal form adopts the corundum structure. It transforms into an orthorhombic structure when heated above 750 °C.

Production
Rhodium oxide can be produced via several routes:
 Treating RhCl3 with oxygen at high temperatures.
 Rh metal powder is fused with potassium hydrogen sulfate. Adding sodium hydroxide results in hydrated rhodium oxide, which upon heating converts to Rh2O3.
 Rhodium oxide thin films can be produced by exposing Rh layer to oxygen plasma.
 Nanoparticles can be produced by the hydrothermal synthesis.

Physical properties
Rhodium oxide films behave as a fast two-color electrochromic system: Reversible yellow ↔ dark green or yellow ↔ brown-purple color changes are obtained in KOH solutions by applying voltage ~1 V.

Rhodium oxide films are transparent and conductive, like indium tin oxide (ITO) - the common transparent electrode, but Rh2O3 has 0.2 eV lower work function than ITO. Consequently, deposition of rhodium oxide on ITO improves the carrier injection from ITO thereby improving the electrical properties of organic light-emitting diodes.

Catalytic properties
Rhodium oxides are catalysts for hydroformylation of alkenes, N2O production from NO, and the hydrogenation of CO.

See also
Rhodium
Rhodium(IV) oxide
Rhodium-platinum oxide

References

Transition metal oxides
Rhodium(III) compounds
Sesquioxides
Chromism